Northwestern Colorado is a region in the northwest portion of Colorado. It borders Western Colorado, Northern Colorado, the north portion of Central Colorado, Southwestern Colorado, Utah, and the northwest state of Wyoming. This region is among the lower populated regions in Colorado.

Counties
Eagle County
Garfield County
Grand County
Moffat County
Rio Blanco County
Routt County

Larger cities/towns

Craig, Colorado
Eagle, Colorado
Edwards, Colorado
Glenwood Springs, Colorado
Meeker, Colorado
Steamboat Springs, Colorado
Vail, Colorado

Regions of Colorado